Holding time may refer to:

Holding (aviation), used to delay aircraft already in flight
Holding time (attachment therapy), where a child is laid upon to produce a cathartic response
Call duration

See also 
Hold time (disambiguation)